China Resources Cement Holdings Limited (CRC), parented by China Resources, is a leading cement and concrete producer in Southern China. It is the largest NSP clinker and cement producer in Southern China by production capacity and the second largest concrete producer in China by sales volume. It was established in 2003 and incorporated in Cayman Islands.

Listing 
China Resources Cement has been listed twice. It was firstly listed on the Hong Kong Stock Exchange in 2003 with its IPO price of HK$2.32 per share. In 2006, it was privatized by its largest shareholder, China Resources (Holdings), with the acquired price of HK$2.45 per share. In 2009, CRC was relisted with its IPO price of HK$3.9 per share. However, its share price is still below its offer price after listing.

References

External links
China Resources Cement Limited

Cement companies of Hong Kong
Companies listed on the Hong Kong Stock Exchange
Government-owned companies of China
China Resources
Companies established in 2003